Esfandaqeh castle is a historical castle located in Jiroft County in Kerman Province, The longevity of this fortress dates back to the Pahlavi dynasty.

References 

Castles in Iran